Lawrence Green may refer to:

Lawrence G. Green (1900–1972), South African journalist and writer
Lawrence W. Green, American academic

See also
Laurence Green (disambiguation)
Larry Green (disambiguation)